Salto Mortale may refer to:

 Salto Mortale (1931 French film), a French film
 Salto Mortale (1931 German film), a German film
 Salto Mortale (1953 film), a West German film
 Salto Mortale (TV series), a West German television series